HHhH is the debut novel of French author Laurent Binet, published in 2010 by Grasset & Fasquelle. The book recounts Operation Anthropoid, the assassination of Nazi leader Reinhard Heydrich in Prague during World War II. The novel was awarded the 2010 Prix Goncourt du Premier Roman.

Plot
The novel follows the history of the operation and the lives of its protagonists—Reinhard Heydrich and his assassins Jozef Gabčík and Jan Kubiš. It is interlaced with the author's account of the process of researching and writing the book, his commentary about other literary and media treatments of the subject, and reflections about the extent to which the behavior of real people may of necessity be fictionalised in a historical novel.

Title
The title is an initialism for Himmlers Hirn heißt Heydrich ("Himmler's brain is called Heydrich"), a quip about Heydrich in SS circles. The title was suggested by Binet's publisher, Grasset, instead of the "too sci-fi" working title Opération Anthropoïde. The editor also requested the cut of about twenty pages criticizing Jonathan Littell's Les Bienveillantes, another novel about the SS in World War II that was awarded the Prix Goncourt in 2006. The Millions published the "missing pages" in 2012.

Translations
HHhH has been translated into more than twenty languages.  The English translation by Sam Taylor was published in the US by Farrar, Straus and Giroux on 24 April 2012 and in the UK by Harvill Secker on 3 May 2012.

Film adaptation

Cédric Jimenez directed a film adaptation of the novel, also known as The Man with the Iron Heart. It starred Jason Clarke, Rosamund Pike, Mia Wasikowska, Jack O'Connell and Jack Reynor.

Awards and honours
2010 Prix Goncourt du Premier Roman
2011 Europese Literatuurprijs, shortlist
2012 National Book Critics Circle Award, finalist
2012 New York Times Notable Book of the Year

References

Fiction set in 1942
2010 French novels
French historical novels
Heinrich Himmler
French novels adapted into films
Non-fiction novels
Novels about Czech resistance to Nazi occupation
Novels set in Prague
Reinhard Heydrich
Works about Operation Anthropoid
Novels set during World War II
2010 debut novels